Stamps School District was a school district headquartered in Stamps, Arkansas.

On July 1, 2003, it consolidated with the Lewisville School District to form the Lafayette County School District.

Further reading
  (Download) - Map of the Stamps district

References

External links
 

Education in Lafayette County, Arkansas
2003 disestablishments in Arkansas
School districts disestablished in 2003
Defunct school districts in Arkansas